Inamori is a Japanese surname. Notable people with the surname include:

, Japanese actress
, Japanese footballer
, Japanese businessman and philanthropist
, Japanese judoka
, Japanese golfer

Japanese-language surnames